The Barkly Highway is a national highway of both Queensland and the Northern Territory in Australia. It is the only sealed road between Queensland and the Northern Territory.

Description

The highway runs between Cloncurry and the junction with the Stuart Highway north of Tennant Creek, known as the "Threeways". The entire highway is part of the National Highway system: in the Northern Territory it is assigned National Route 66; the Queensland portion is designated as National Route A2.

The Northern Territory section has a speed limit of  along most of its length.

It is the main transport route between Queensland and the Northern Territory, consequently many road trains use it.

Upgrades
An upgrade of the Queensland section of the highway between Mount Isa and Camooweal was completed in 2008 and despite floods of 2009, 2010 and 2011, the Queensland sections of road were in good condition (as of 2015).

The Northern Australia Roads Program announced in 2016 included the following project for the Barkiy Highway.

Intersection upgrades
The project for intersection upgrades in Mount Isa urban area was completed in mid 2019 at a total cost of $8.3 million.

Georgina River Bridge 

Given the economic importance of transport on this route, a longstanding problem was the flooding of the Georgina River immediately west of Camooweal in Queensland. As the water levels in the Georgina River vary enormously from being completely dry to flooding, the Barkly Highway bridge over the Georgina River was often unusable for many days due to flooding, with road trains and other heavy vehicles having to wait weeks before it was safe to cross. To alleviate these problems, the Georgina River Bridge was officially opened on 20 December 2002 by Senator Ron Boswell and Steve Breadhauer, Minister for Transport in the Queensland Government. The bridge uses an unusual arch design to avoid placing pylons into the river bed which is culturally significant to the local Dugalunji people, who call the new bridge Ilaga Thuwani meaning The Camping Ground of the Rainbow Serpent.

List of towns along the Barkly Highway 
 Cloncurry
 Mount Isa
 Camooweal

Major intersections

See also

 Highways in Australia
 List of highways in the Northern Territory
 List of highways in Queensland
 List of highways numbered 66

References

External links

Highways in the Northern Territory
Highways in Queensland
North West Queensland